The pica is a typographic unit of measure corresponding to approximately  of an inch, or from  to  of a foot. One pica is further divided into 12 points.

In printing, three pica measures are used:

 The French pica of 12 Didot points (also called cicero) generally is: 12 × 0.376 = .
It was established by the United States Type Founders' Association in 1886.

Publishing applications such as Adobe InDesign and QuarkXPress represent pica measurements with whole-number picas left of a lower-case p, followed by the points number, for example: 5p6 represents 5 picas and 6 points, or 5 picas.

Cascading Style Sheets (CSS) defined by the World Wide Web Consortium use pc as the abbreviation for pica ( of an inch), and pt for point ( of an inch).

The pica is also used in measuring the font capacity and is applied in the process of copyfitting. The font length is measured there by the number of characters per pica (cpp). As books are most often printed with proportional fonts, cpp of a given font is usually a fractional number. For example, an 11-point font (like Helvetica) may have 2.4 cpp, thus a 5-inch (30-pica) line of a usual octavo-sized (6×8 in) book page would contain around 72 characters (including spaces). 

There have existed copyfitting tables for a number of typefaces, and typefoundries often provided the number of characters per pica for each type in their specimen catalogs. Similar tables exist as well with which one can estimate the number of characters per pica knowing the lower-case alphabet length.

The typographic pica should not be confused with the Pica font of the typewriters, which means a font where 10 typed characters make up a line one inch long.

See also
 Point (typography)
 Pitch (typewriter)

References

Typography
Units of length
Customary units of measurement in the United States